The Caldor Fire was a large wildfire that burned  in the Eldorado National Forest and other areas of the Sierra Nevada in El Dorado, Amador, and Alpine County, California, in the United States during the 2021 California wildfire season. The fire was first reported on Saturday, August 14, 2021, and was fully contained on Thursday, October 21, 2021. The Caldor Fire destroyed 1,003 structures and damaged 81 more, primarily in the US Highway 50 corridor and in the community of Grizzly Flats, 2/3 of which was destroyed by the fire.

On August 30, it became the second fire known to cross the Sierra Nevada mountain range, following the Dixie Fire, which crossed a few days earlier on August 18. It then threatened the communities of Meyers and South Lake Tahoe, causing evacuations to be ordered for more than 20,000 people before the fire's progress was halted. The Caldor Fire was the third-largest and second-most-destructive of the 2021 season in California, and the 15th-largest and 16th-most destructive in recorded California history.

The cause of the fire is currently under investigation.

Name
The old logging town of Caldor is located near Omo Ranch, close to the origin of the fire. The town was part of the Diamond and Caldor Railway lumber route, running from Diamond Springs to Caldor. Originally called "Dogtown", the abandoned settlement was renamed after the new owners, the California Door Company.

Events

The Caldor Fire started on August 14, 2021, near Little Mountain, south of Pollock Pines in El Dorado County, about two miles east of Omo Ranch and four miles south of Grizzly Flats. It initially burned slowly, where little attention was given to it because of other larger fires, but exploded in size on August 16 due to high winds and high fuel loads in the area. By August 20, the fire had burned nearly to Highway 50, forcing a closure of the highway.

Over the next few days, the fire crossed Highway 50 in the vicinity of Kyburz. Starting on August 27, winds drove the fire rapidly east towards the Lake Tahoe Basin, devastating the once picturesque backdrop to the historic Strawberry Lodge near the Twin Bridges area. While South Lake Tahoe remained at the evacuation warning stage during early morning briefings that day, the entire city of 22,000 people was ordered to evacuate at 10:59 AM. Due to the focused efforts of fire crews aggressively thinning nearby forests, reducing earlier crown fires (typically  flames) to surface fires (typically  flames) and developing a fire perimeter, evacuation orders were lifted about one week later.

By October 2, the fire was at 221,775 acres and 91% containment. By that date, 782 structures were destroyed, 81 structures damaged, with 35 structures still threatened. Staffing was still at 1,589 personnel, with ten helicopters assigned to the incident.

The Caldor Fire was fully contained on October 21, 2021.

Impacts

Casualties 
In September 2021 it was reported that 18 people had been injured due to the fire, with the majority of them being identified as firefighters. Two people were injured in Grizzly Flats and were airlifted to hospitals.

Damage 
The Caldor Fire destroyed 1,003 structures, many of them in Grizzly Flats. The residents of Grizzly Flats were notified to evacuate on the night of August 16th since the fire had shifted towards the town. The fire destroyed 2/3rds of the community in the early morning of August 17th despite the firefighters best efforts.

Evacuations and closures 
On August 17, evacuations were ordered for Grizzly Flats, Somerset, Sly Park Reservoir and Pollock Pines. Governor Gavin Newsom declared a state of emergency for El Dorado County over a day later after the explosive growth. As of Sunday night (August 29), evacuation orders were sent out to some residents of the Tahoe Basin as well as locations in Amador County.

Environmental 
There were concerns that runoff from the Caldor Fire's burned footprint would have negative impacts on the water quality of the Lake Tahoe watershed. However, in testing conducted by the League to Save Lake Tahoe in October after the fire was fully contained, it was found that there had been relatively little impact on the turbidity of Lake Tahoe's water.

Cause 
The cause of the fire is under investigation. On December 8, 2021, two men (a father and son) were arrested and charged in relation to the Caldor Fire. Court filings stated that investigators believe "the Caldor Fire likely ignited when a projectile discharged from a firearm and struck an object, causing heated fragments of the projectile to land in a dry receptive fuel bed, igniting the fuels.” This was based on bullet casings, earplugs, electronic device location data, and DNA evidence from the scene, leading the El Dorado County District Attorney's office to believe that the two men started the fire. Both men were accused of violating California state law by reckless arson and were held on a $1 million bail. The attorney for the two men stated that the men are not guilty and were in Eldorado National Forest the day of the fire, and called 911 to report the fire once they regained cell service. He also stated that the pair knew of the Caldor Fire investigation as early as August 2021, when search warrants were conducted on their homes.

Progression and containment status

Gallery

Effects of the Caldor Fire:

References

External links

 InciWeb Caldor Fire Page
 California Department of Forestry and Fire Protection (CAL FIRE)

2021 California wildfires
August 2021 events in the United States
Wildfires in El Dorado County, California
Wildfires in Amador County, California
Wildfires in Alpine County, California